Stock Squad is a 1985 Australian television film directed by Howard Rubie and starring Martin Sacks, Gerard Kennedy, Kris McQuade, and Richard Meikle. It focuses on the rural crime division.

References

External links

Australian television films
1988 television films
1988 films
1980s English-language films
Films directed by Howard Rubie